Cyperus ixiocarpus is a sedge of the family Cyperaceae that is native to northern parts of Australia.

The plant blooms between February and July producing yellow-green-brown flowers.

The species was first described by the botanist Ferdinand von Mueller in 1887 as a part of the work, Transactions Of The Royal Society Of Victoria. 

It is found across northern Australia in Western Australia, Queensland and the Northern Territory in seasonally dry tropical areas. In Western Australia it is found along sandy creek and river beds in the Gascoyne and Pilbara regions where it grows in red sandy-loamy soils.

See also
List of Cyperus species

References

Plants described in 1887
Flora of Western Australia
ixiocarpus
Taxa named by Ferdinand von Mueller
Flora of the Northern Territory
Flora of Queensland